Christophe Impens (born 9 December 1969 in Ghent) is a retired Belgian athlete who competed in middle-distance events. He represented his country at the 1996 Summer Olympics, as well as two outdoor and two indoor World Championships. His biggest success is the silver medal in the 3000 metres at the 1996 European Indoor Championships.

Competition record

Personal bests
Outdoor
1500 metres – 3:34.13 (Brussels 1996) NR
One Mile – 3:55.75 (Brussels 1993)
Indoor
1500 metres – 3:38.01 (Ghent 1997)
One Mile – 3:54.13 (Ghent 1997) NR
3000 metres – 7:49.43 (Ghent 1996)

References

1969 births
Living people
Sportspeople from Ghent
Belgian male middle-distance runners
Olympic athletes of Belgium
Athletes (track and field) at the 1996 Summer Olympics
World Athletics Championships athletes for Belgium
20th-century Belgian people